Asha Bordoloi  is an Assamese film actress from Assam, India.  She has acted in a number of Assamese movies and stage dramas. She is best known for her role Malati in the National award-winning film Kothanodi.

Early life and education
Asha Bordoloi was born at Barhampur in Nagaon district, Assam.

Political career
Bordoloi joined Bharatiya Janata Party and currently serving as Cultural Committee In-charge of Bharatiya Janata Yuva Morcha.

Filmography

Feature films

Television
She acted in few television serials.
Junbai
Anurag
Xahu Buwari
Umal Bukur Xejar Kahini
Sabda
Jeevon Dot Com
Mukha
Anjali

Stage plays
Few of her stage plays are:
Siraj

References

External links

Living people
Actresses in Assamese cinema
People from Nagaon district
Indian film actresses
Actresses from Assam
Year of birth missing (living people)